"Gotta Thing About You" is a song recorded by Swedish boyband FO&O. The song was released as a digital download in Sweden on 26 February 2017 and peaked at number 10 on the Swedish Singles Chart. It took part in Melodifestivalen 2017, and qualified to andra chansen from the third semi-final on 18 February 2017. The song qualified from andra chansen on 4 March 2017. It was written by Robert "Mutt" Lange and Tony Nilsson.

Charts

Weekly charts

Year-end charts

Certifications

Release history

References

2017 singles
2016 songs
Melodifestivalen songs of 2017
FO&O songs
Songs written by Tony Nilsson
Songs written by Robert John "Mutt" Lange